Shuanggui is a town under the administration of Zhong County, Chongqing, China. , it administers Guixi Residential Community and the following 11 villages:
Shuanggui Village
Lianhua Village
Ganchang Village
Shiqiao Village
Tongde Village
Jiulong Village
Shibao Village
Renhe Village
Datang Village
Longqiao Village
Guoqiao Village

References 

Township-level divisions of Chongqing
Zhong County